Sledgehammer Games, Inc. is an American video game developer company formed in 2009 by Glen Schofield and Michael Condrey. The pair formerly worked at Visceral Games and are responsible for the creation of Dead Space. The company is based in Foster City, California. The studio has developed or co-developed various video games in the Call of Duty series.

History
Sledgehammer Games co-founders Schofield and Condrey worked together at Electronic Arts in 2005 on 007: From Russia with Love, with Condrey as director and Schofield executive producer. The collaboration carried forward to Dead Space. The two men had complementary skills and similar backgrounds—middle class with fathers in the construction business.

After founding Sledgehammer Games on July 21, 2009, Schofield and Condrey made Activision a proposal: they would attempt to replicate their success with Dead Space, with a third-person spin-off of the Call of Duty franchise. Activision sat on the proposal for weeks until Activision Blizzard CEO Bobby Kotick offered to bring the studio into the Activision fold. Schofield and Condrey accepted, viewing Activision's independent studio model as an opportunity to preserve the company's creative culture, development methodology and staff, while having the security of an alliance with the industry's largest publisher.

Sledgehammer Games spent six to eight months working on the Call of Duty project in 2009, enough to produce a prototype with about 15 minutes of play. The game would have reportedly expanded the franchise into the action-adventure genre, and a legal battle between Infinity Ward, the studio behind the Modern Warfare franchise, and co-founders Jason West and Vince Zampella resulted in the pair's departure. They took several Infinity Ward employees with them to their new company, leaving Activision with about half the staff and a deadline of about 20 months (versus a typical 24 months) to complete the next game in the franchise, Call of Duty: Modern Warfare 3. Activision requested that Sledgehammer Games stop work on the third-person shooter and collaborate with Infinity Ward instead.

The offer was a gamble for both sides. Activision was calling on a studio that had not put out a game on its own, while Sledgehammer Games would be abandoning weeks of work in the genre they were most familiar with to take on a punishing schedule in a franchise. The studio first polled its staff and got unanimous approval. "It was a massive risk for Schofield and Condrey's new studio, and one that most outside of the industry never considered", wrote Ryan Fleming in Digital Trends. "The Infinity Ward name was the marquis on the Modern Warfare franchise, but failure to deliver on Activision's golden egg would have resulted in a wave that crippled those in its path. Looking back at the success of that game and franchise as a whole, it is easy to overlook the chance Sledgehammer took."

The collaboration with Infinity Ward marked the first time a co-development relationship would produce a Modern Warfare title, with both companies' logos appearing on the packaging. Despite the companies’ differing histories and development methodologies, GamesTM called the arrangement "a rare symbiotic relationship for such a high-profile game". The two teams first met in the spring of 2010 to compare ideas. There was some overlap: both teams wanted to set the game in Europe and, recalled Schofield, achieve a “payoff on the story that had been told over the last four years.”

It was announced in February 2014 that Sledgehammer Games would be developing a Call of Duty title slated for release in 2014. On May 1, Game Informer teased an image of a soldier wearing an exo-skeleton suit. It was also announced that more details, the cover, the full name, and a trailer would be released on May 4. The trailer was leaked which confirmed the release of Call of Duty: Advanced Warfare on November 4, 2014.

On April 21, 2017, Sledgehammer Games and Activision announced their next Call of Duty game, titled Call of Duty: WWII. It was released on November 3, 2017.

In February 2018, Glen Schofield and Michael Condrey left Sledgehammer Games but still working with Activision. In December 2018, Condrey subsequently left Activision to start a career with 2K Games in the Bay Area with 31st Union. Schofield also left the studio to found Striking Distance.

In 2019, while working on Call of Duty: Black Ops Cold War, the 2020 entry in the series, with Raven Software, the two teams had differing ideas on the game. This led Call of Duty publisher Activision  to bring in fellow developer Treyarch to take over the lead development role for Black Ops Cold War, while Sledgehammer and Raven Software took on partner roles.

Sledgehammer opened a new studio in Melbourne, Australia by September 2019. In May 2020, Sledgehammer Games COO Andy Wilson confirmed that the studio was now a multi-project studio with over 200 employees, with plans to hire up to 100 new employees over the next year.

In May 2021, Sledgehammer announced the opening of a new studio in Toronto, Canada. By August 2021, Sledgehammer Games employed over 450 people, with over 150 people working at Sledgehammer Games Melbourne and just over 10 people working at Sledgehammer Games Toronto. In October 2021, Sledgehammer opened a new studio in Guildford in the UK.

Operations and culture
Sledgehammer Games operates out of a "custom-designed" studio with an open-plan space, "high-end" development equipment, and a theater.

As of February 2013, Sledgehammer employs about 200 people, with a turnover of under 1%. New employees are given a challenge coin engraved with the Sledgehammer Games' values. The tradition dates back to a World War I practice of giving soldiers coins with a squadron's insignia that could be used to prove membership.

Games

References

External links

Image gallery of Sledgehammer Games

American companies established in 2009
Video game development companies
Video game companies based in California
Software companies based in the San Francisco Bay Area
Companies based in Foster City, California
Video game companies established in 2009
2009 establishments in California
Activision